In July and August 2018, South Africa A cricket team visited  India to play two first-class matches against India A. India A won the two-match series 1–0. They were joined by India B and Australia A cricket team for a List-A Quadrangular Series in August. India-B defeated Australia-A in the final to win the series. After Quadrangular series, Australia-A played two first-class matches against India A.The two-match series was drawn 1-1.

India 'A' vs South Africa 'A' First-Class Series

Squads

Three-Day Warm-up Match : Indian Board's President's XI vs South Africa 'A'

1st Unofficial Test

2nd Unofficial Test

Quadrangular Series 

The quadrangular series was initially scheduled to be held at Vijayawada but was forced to move out due to the incessant rains after the first four games of the series were washed out without a ball bowled. The venue was shifted to Bengaluru.

Squads 

Vijay Shankar was ruled out of the quadrangular series due to the left hamstring injury. On August 22, Ambati Rayudu and Kedar Jadhav were added to the India A and India B squads respectively while Siddhesh Lad and Ricky Bhui were released from the squads for the Duleep Trophy. Hanuma Vihari and Prithvi Shaw from India A were added to the India squad for the ongoing England tour. On August 25, Jayant Yadav was diagnosed with a right side strain and was ruled out of the tournament with Jalaj Saxena being named as his replacement for India B. On August 27, Bhuvneshwar Kumar has been added to the India-A squad to play in the third-place play-off against South Africa A.

Points Table 

 Top two teams advanced to the final

Matches

1st Match

2nd Match

3rd Match

4th Match

5th Match

6th Match

7th Match

8th Match

9th Match

10th Match

Third place play-off

Final

India 'A' vs Australia 'A' First-Class series 

The first-class series was initially scheduled to be held at Vijayawada but was forced to move to Bengaluru due to depression in Bay of Bengal, which had resulted in heavy showers in Andhra Pradesh.

Squads

1st Unofficial Test

2nd Unofficial Test

Statistics

Most runs

Most wickets

External links
 Series home at ESPN Cricinfo

References 

A team cricket
India